Ionuț Constantin (born 27 July 2001) is a Romanian professional footballer who plays as a midfielder for Concordia II Chiajna. He made his debut in Liga I on 2 June 2019, in a match between Gaz Metan Mediaș and Concordia Chiajna, ended with the score of 3–1.

References

External links
 Ionuț Constantin at lpf.ro

2001 births
Living people
Romanian footballers
Association football midfielders
Liga I players
CS Concordia Chiajna players